Barboursville Historic District is a national historic district located at Barboursville, Cabell County, West Virginia. The district encompasses 20 contributing buildings in the central business district of Barboursville and mostly contains several good examples of late 19th and early 20th century commercial architecture.  Notable buildings include the First United Methodist Church Parsonage (c. 1925), Brady Hardware Building (1906), First National Bank (1870), Ossie Mills General Store, Barber Shop (c. 1870), Adams Building (1950), and Miller/Thornburg Store (Edward Jones) (1854).

It was listed on the National Register of Historic Places in 2008.

References

Historic districts in Cabell County, West Virginia
Neoclassical architecture in West Virginia
Buildings and structures in Cabell County, West Virginia
National Register of Historic Places in Cabell County, West Virginia
Commercial buildings on the National Register of Historic Places in West Virginia
Historic districts on the National Register of Historic Places in West Virginia